Clay Myers State Natural Area at Whalen Island is a state park in the U.S. state of Oregon, administered by the Oregon Parks and Recreation Department.  The park was created in 2000 and named after a former secretary of state for the State of Oregon, Clay Myers.  Although not a true island, Whalen Island is surrounded by Sand Lake Estuary and wetlands. Whalen Island can be visited on a  loop trail around its perimeter.

See also
 List of Oregon state parks

References

External links
 

State parks of Oregon
Parks in Tillamook County, Oregon